Verticordia densiflora var. pedunculata, commonly known as long-stalked featherflower, is a flowering plant in the myrtle family, Myrtaceae and is endemic to the south-west of Western Australia. It is a shrub with small leaves and mauve-pink flowers which fade to white. It is one of five varieties of the species Verticordia densiflora and is distinguished from the others by its much longer flower stalks.

Description

The flowers are pale to bright mauve-pink and fade to white as they age. Flowering occurs from December to January.

Taxonomy and naming
Verticordia densiflora was first formally described by John Lindley in 1839 and the description was published in A Sketch of the Vegetation of the Swan River Colony. In 1991, Alex George undertook a review of the genus Verticordia and described five varieties of Verticordia densiflora including this variety.

Distribution and habitat
This variety of V. densiflora grows in sandy soil or sand with clay or loam, often in winter-wet areas or in degraded, weed-infested areas. It is found in a small area near Busselton in the Jarrah Forest and Swan Coastal Plain biogeographic regions.

Conservation
Verticordia densiflora var. pedunculata is classified as "Threatened Flora (Declared Rare Flora — Extant)" by the Western Australian Government Department of Parks and Wildlife and as "Endangered" (EN) under the Australian Government Environment Protection and Biodiversity Conservation Act 1999 (EPBC Act). In 1997 the total population of mature plants was estimated to be 500. The main threats to the variety are thought to be land clearing for urban development and degradation of road verges.

Use in horticulture
Little is known about the growing requirements of this variety but research needs to be undertaken to help ensure its continued existence.

References

densiflora var. pedunculata
Rosids of Western Australia
Eudicots of Western Australia
Plants described in 1977
Endemic flora of Western Australia